Elastosis perforans serpiginosa is a unique perforating disorder characterized by transepidermal elimination of elastic fibers and distinctive clinical lesions, which are serpiginous in distribution and can be associated with specific diseases.

See also 
 List of cutaneous conditions
 Poikiloderma vasculare atrophicans

References

External links 

Abnormalities of dermal fibrous and elastic tissue